KMTR (channel 16) is a television station in Eugene, Oregon, United States, affiliated with NBC and The CW Plus. It is owned by Roberts Media, LLC, which maintains a shared services agreement (SSA) with Sinclair Broadcast Group, owner of CBS affiliate KVAL-TV (channel 13), for the provision of certain services. Both stations share studios on Blanton Road in Eugene, while KMTR's transmitter is located on Coburg Ridge. KMTR maintained separate facilities on International Court in Springfield, Oregon, until 2020 when the station relocated to KVAL's building; master control and some internal operations for KMTR were based at the KVAL studios.

KMTR reaches additional viewers in west-central Oregon via co-owned full-power satellite stations KMCB (channel 23) in Coos Bay and KTCW (channel 46) in Roseburg.

History
The station began broadcasting on October 4, 1982, after former NBC affiliate KVAL-TV began selectively omitting certain NBC prime time broadcasts from its evening lineup, replacing them with alternate programming from rival network, CBS. The resulting conflict over this programming decision preceded the introduction of KMTR to the media market, and a switch of KVAL's affiliation from NBC to CBS. The Columbia Empire Broadcasting Corporation of Yakima, Washington, acquired the station in 1984.

In late 1995, the station was bought by the Wicks Broadcast Group of New York City. In March 1996, Wicks Broadcast Group named Brian Benschoter the station's new GM; he started shaking things up immediately for the third-place Eugene-based station. On May 21, 1996, he abruptly fired longtime sports anchors Brian Lamb and Steve Freedman without warning. Lamb, an 11½ year veteran of the station, and Freedman, an 8½ year employee, introduced the "Prep Athlete of the Week" segment that became an immensely popular weekly honor. The award is still considered by locals as the top media honor one can receive for high school sports in the Eugene/Springfield area. Lamb and Freedman were replaced by Joe Giansante, a sports talk radio host on KUGN AM 590.

In September 1998, an agreement between KMTR, The WB 100+ Station Group and the area's cable provider allowed the station to launch cable-only WB affiliate "KZWB". Since it was a cable-exclusive outlet, the call sign was not officially recognized by the Federal Communications Commission (FCC). KMTR provided sales and promotional opportunities to the cable channel.

In March 1999, Wicks sold KMTR to the Ackerley Group, who merged with Clear Channel Communications (now iHeartMedia) in 2001. KMTR was named "Station of the Year" for 2005 by the Oregon Association of Broadcasters (OAB).

In February 2006, the two satellite stations, KMTZ and KMTX, changed their call letters to KUCW and KTCW, respectively. In May 2006, KMTR signed a long term affiliation agreement with The CW, a replacement network for the WB. In September 2006, KMTR added The CW on a digital subchannel, replacing the cable-only KZWB.

On April 20, 2007, Clear Channel entered into an agreement to sell its entire television stations group to Newport Television, a unit of Providence Equity Partners. The deal closed on March 14, 2008.

KMTR shut down its analog signal, over UHF channel 16, on February 17, 2009, the original target date on which full-power television stations in the United States were to transition from analog to digital broadcasts under federal mandate (which was later pushed back to June 12, 2009). The station's digital signal remained on its pre-transition UHF channel 17. Through the use of PSIP, digital television receivers display the station's virtual channel as its former UHF analog channel 16.

In 2012, Newport Television entered into agreements to sell most of its stations to the Nexstar Broadcasting Group, Sinclair Broadcast Group, Cox Media Group and Shield Media, LLC. It would not be until November 26, 2012, when Newport announced a sale to Fisher Communications. Because Fisher already owned KVAL-TV, Fisher assigned the rights to acquire the FCC license to KMTR Television, LLC, which is wholly owned by Roberts Media, LLC. Roberts Media is wholly owned by veteran broadcaster Larry Roberts. KMTR Television then entered into a shared services agreement (SSA) with Fisher. WHAM-TV in Rochester, New York, was the last remaining station to be owned by Newport Television as of November 2012 that had not yet been sold, until December 3 when it was announced that Sinclair would acquire the non-license assets of WHAM.  While still awaiting FCC approval of the sale to KMTR Television, LLC, on April 11, 2013, Fisher announced that it would sell its properties, including KVAL and the planned SSA with KMTR, to Sinclair. 
The FCC granted its approval of KMTR to KMTR Television, LLC, on April 24 and the sale was consummated June 3, 2013. On February 19, KMTR was the sole Newport Television property, until June 1 when it was the last station to have its sale completed. After the completion of the sale, certain operations and personnel changes were made. The sale of the Fisher stations to Sinclair was completed on August 8, 2013.

In 2016, KMTR remained the only "Big Four" network-affiliated station in Western Oregon to produce its local newscasts in pillarboxed 4:3 standard definition until finally switching to 16:9 on October 22.

Beginning in 2019, KMTR began moving out of its original building in Springfield. As of summer 2020, KMTR's studios and master control room are in the same facility as KVAL, and KMTR has upgraded its newscasts and syndicated programming to HD.

By the end of 2019, CW Eugene has been airing in 720p high definition over KMTR and KMCB (and all their associated repeater signals); however, KTCW (and its associated repeater signals) continued to air the subchannel in 4:3 standard definition, until it was upgraded by the end of March 2020.

On July 28, 2021, the FCC issued a Forfeiture Order stemming from a lawsuit against KMTR owner Roberts Media. The lawsuit, filed by AT&T, alleged that Roberts failed to negotiate for retransmission consent in good faith for KMTR. Owners of other Sinclair-managed stations, such as Deerfield Media, were also named in the lawsuit. Roberts was ordered to pay a fine of $512,228.

KMTR served as the host station for the 2022 World Athletics Championships which were held at the University of Oregon's Hayward Field. It was the only station on the West Coast where weekend prime time coverage of the event was carried live; all other West Coast markets aired coverage on tape delay.

Technical information

Subchannels
The stations' digital signals are multiplexed:

Rebroadcasters

Satellite stations

Notes:
1. Aside from their transmitters, KMCB and KTCW do not maintain any physical presence in their respective cities of license.
2. The Broadcasting and Cable Yearbook says KTCW signed on April 8, while the Television and Cable Factbook says it signed on April 20.

Translators

References

External links

CW Eugene

NBC network affiliates
Comet (TV network) affiliates
Sinclair Broadcast Group
Television channels and stations established in 1982
Springfield, Oregon
MTR
1982 establishments in Oregon